Pak Hwasŏng or Pak Kyŏngsun (1904–1988) was a Korean novelist, short story writer and essayist. A witness to both Korea under Japanese rule and the Korean War, Pak's stories foregrounded social concerns and the particular situation of women caught in circumstances out of their control.

Life
Pak Hwasŏng's first published story, 'Ch'usŏk chŏnya' (Autumn Harvest Day Eve) - the story of a girl working in a textiles factory - appeared in the literary magazine Chosŏn mundan in 1925. In 1926 she enrolled in the English department of Nihon Women's College in Japan, joining the Tokyo branch of Kŭnuhoe. Unable to complete her studies, Pak returned to Korea, working as an educator in schools and for a variety of literary organizations.

Works
 'Ch'usŏk chŏnya' (Autumn Harvest Day Eve), 1925, first published in the literary magazine Chosŏn mundan
 Hongsu chŏnhu (Before and After the Flood), 1932
 Paekhwa (White Flower), 1932. Serialised in Tonga ilbo. 
 'Kohyang ŏmnŭn saramdŭl' (People without Homeland), 1936
 Hyuhwasan (Inactive Volcano), 1977
 Kohyang ŏmnŭn saramdŭl (People Without A Homeland'), 1994

References

1904 births
1988 deaths
Korean novelists
South Korean women short story writers
South Korean short story writers
Korean women writers
20th-century novelists
20th-century women writers
20th-century short story writers